Friederike Lauber (married name Scharfegger) 1937–1996, was an Austrian international table tennis player.

She won a bronze medal at the 1953 World Table Tennis Championships in the Corbillon Cup with Gertrude Pritzi and Ermelinde Wertl for Austria.

She was Austrian champion in 1960 and 1961.

See also
 List of table tennis players
 List of World Table Tennis Championships medalists

References

Austrian female table tennis players
1937 births
1996 deaths
World Table Tennis Championships medalists
People from Mürzzuschlag
Sportspeople from Styria